Florian Ceynowa (Kashubian Florión Cenôwa) (May 4, 1817 – March 26, 1881) was a doctor, political activist, writer, and linguist. He undertook efforts to identify Kashubian language, culture and traditions. He and Alexander Hilferding were not the only ones to study the language and legends of the Kashubians, but they had the greatest influence and prompted others to take up investigations. The individual nature of the Kashubian character and language was first described by Hilferding, to whom we are indebted for the first data about the range of Kashubian dialects. In 1856, he and Ceynowa traveled to the Kashubia. He awakened Kashubian self-identity, thereby opposing Germanisation and Prussian authority, and Polish nobility and clergy. He believed in a separate Kashubian identity and strove for a Russian-led pan-Slavic federation. He strove to create a program aimed at the introduction of a Kashubian standard in grammar, pronunciation and spelling, based on the spirit of the 1848 Revolution. He compiled treatises on Kashubian grammar and published Kashubian texts along with their translations into other Slavic languages. An important person for Kashubian literature, he was also a translator of Russian texts into Kashubian language.

Ceynowa was a pioneer of the nationalist movement among the Kashubian people in the mid-19th century. He was part of an attempt to take the Prussian garrison in Preußisch Stargard (Starogard Gdański) during 1846, but the operation failed when his 100 combatants, armed only with scythes, decided to abandon the site before the attack was carried out.

Works
De terrae Pucensis incolarum superstitione in re medica: dissertatio inauguralis medica / quam ... publice defendet auctor Florianus Ceynowa, Berlin: Schlesinger, 1851, no ISBN.
Xążeczka dlo Kaszebov przez Wójkasena,  Danzig: 1850, no ISBN 
Kurze Betrachtungen über die kaßubische Sprache, als Entwurf zur Grammatik, ed., introd. and comm. by Aleksandr Dmitrievič Duličenko and Werner Lehfeldt, Göttingen: Vandenhoeck & Ruprecht, 1998, (=Abhandlungen der Akademie der Wissenschaften zu Göttingen, Philologisch-Historische Klasse; series 3, No. 229), .
"Mały zbiór wyrazów kaszubskich maja̜cych wie̜ksze podobieństwo w je̜zyku rosyjskim aniżeli w je̜zyku polskim" [Parallel title: 'Eine kleine Sammlung kaschubischer Wörter, welche eine größere Ähnlichkeit mit rußischen als mit der polnischen Sprache haben'; Kashubian] (Danzig: 11850), Hanna Popowska-Taborska (ed.), in: Uwagi o Kaszubszczyźnie, Jerzy Treder (ed.) on behalf of the Muzeum Piśmiennictwa i Muzyki Kaszubsko-Pomorskiej, Wejherowo: Muzeum Piśmiennictwa i Muzyki Kaszubsko-Pomorskiej, 22001, (=Biblioteka kaszubska),  / 83-88487-75-2.
Sbjor pjesnj svjatovih, ktòre lud skovjanjskj vkròlestvje pruskjm spjevacj lubj, vidal, Schwetz: J. Hauste, 1878, no ISBN.
Sto frartovek a potudrovéj czéscj Pomorza Kaszubśkjego, osoblivje z zjemj Svjeckjèj, Krajmi, Koczevja i Boròv, Schwetz: no year, no ISBN.
Zarés do grammatiki kašébsko-slovjnskje mòvé [Parallel title: 'Entwurf zur Grammatik der kassubisch-slovinischen Sprache'; Kashubian], Posen: Simon, 1879, no ISBN.

Bibliography 
 J. Drzeżdżon, Współczesna literatura kaszubska 1945-1980, Warszawa 1986
 G. Stone, Slav outposts in Central European history : the Wends, Sorbs and Kashubs, London, UK : Bloomsbury Academic, an imprint of Bloomsbury Publishing Plc, 2016, pp. 233-6,287
 Jerzy Treder: Kashubian to Polish. Language Contacts

1817 births
1881 deaths
People from Puck County
Kashubians
Kashubian language
Kashubian translators
Kashubian culture
Kashubian-language writers
Polish politicians
19th-century translators
Poles - political prisoners in the Prussian partition
Polish social activists of the Prussian partition